Veronique Marrier D'Unienville-Le Viuex (born July 18, 1967) is an athlete from Mauritius who competes in archery.

At the 2008 Summer Olympics in Beijing Marrier D'Unienville finished her ranking round with a total of 605 points. This gave her the 53rd seed for the final competition bracket in which she faced Aida Román in the first round. The archer from Mexico was too strong and won the confrontation with 108-97, eliminating Marrier D'Unienville straight away.

References

External links

1967 births
Living people
Mauritian people of French descent
Olympic archers of Mauritius
Archers at the 2008 Summer Olympics
Mauritian female archers
People from Plaines Wilhems District